License to Wed is a 2007 American romantic comedy film directed by Ken Kwapis. Starring Robin Williams, Mandy Moore and John Krasinski with Christine Taylor, Eric Christian Olsen and Josh Flitter in supporting roles, the film tells the story of a reverend who puts an engaged couple through a grueling marriage preparation course to see if they are meant to be married in his church. The film was released in theaters in the United States on July 3, 2007 by Warner Bros. Pictures, and was a box office hit, grossing $70.2 million against a $35 million budget, but received negative reviews from critics.

Plot
Sadie Jones has always longed to marry the man of her dreams in her family church. Though she has found her lifetime companion in Ben Murphy, Sadie is distressed to learn that St. Augustine's has only one wedding slot available over the next two years, though after re-checking their planning book, they find that the wedding can be held in three weeks.

While Sadie and Ben do qualify for the slot, the church's eccentric minister, Reverend Frank will not wed the couple until they agree to attend his prenuptial course (shortened, due to the new date, from three months to three weeks). As their wedding date draws near, Sadie and Ben must now follow all of Reverend Frank's rules, attend his unusual classes, and complete a series of homework assignments designed specifically to irritate one another — in order to get past puppy love and ensure that their union will have a sound foundation.

In one part of the course, the couple has to care for twin "creepy robot" babies, to simulate parenting. Due to a technical issue, they get on Ben's last nerve and he destroys one, to the horror of bystanders in a department store. To Ben's dismay, one of Frank's rules is no pre-marital sex. To ensure compliance, Frank has his young assistant to break into the couple's house and bug it. Thus, Frank and his assistant can listen to all conversations, though Frank does not let his assistant listen to the adult parts. Ben discovers the microphone/transmitter but does not tell Sadie, for fear she will accuse him of lying and planting the bug himself.

Problems gradually begin to develop between the couple due to the course. Ben begins an investigation into Frank, and eventually discovers that he was once married to a Maria Gonzalez. Shortly before the wedding, Sadie becomes reluctant to have the wedding, among other things because Ben has not prepared marriage vows as Frank instructed them to do, but instead drew a flip cartoon of a truck. Ben then confronts Frank over Maria Gonzalez, believing him to be a hypocrite. Frank reveals that the marriage was done to allow Maria, then an immigrant, and a member of Frank's congregation, to stay in the U.S. Upset that Ben would waste his time on a "stupid investigation", Sadie calls off the wedding. On Frank's advice, Sadie goes on vacation to Jamaica, their intended honeymoon destination.

Ben seeks advice from his friend Joel, who advises him to give up on Sadie, saying that there are other women like her out there. Ben, however, disagrees with this, and decides to go to Jamaica. Frank and his assistant travel there too. He attempts to call Sadie, but she refuses to listen. Her parents assure her that all marriages have problems, and her friend Carlisle tells her that Ben may just want someone who relies on him, allowing her to forgive Ben more easily. Ben writes his vows on the sands of the beach to impress Sadie, they reconcile, and Frank marries them there.

Cast
 Robin Williams as Reverend Frank Littleton
 Mandy Moore as Sadie Jones-Murphy
 John Krasinski as Ben Murphy
 Eric Christian Olsen as Carlisle Myers
 Christine Taylor as Lindsey Jones
 Josh Flitter as Cameron the Choir Boy
 DeRay Davis as Joel Howard
 Peter Strauss as Mr. Jones
 Grace Zabriskie as Grandma Jones
 Roxanne Hart as Mrs. Jones
 Mindy Kaling as Shelly Rawat
 Angela Kinsey as Judith the Jewelry Clerk
 Rachael Harris as Janine Petroski
 Brian Baumgartner as Jim Boyce
 Wanda Sykes as Nurse Borman

Production

Filming partially took place at First Congregational Church in Long Beach, California, as well as other locations in the region. Ken Kwapis frequently directed episodes of the U.S. television show The Office. This resulted in appearances from The Office cast members John Krasinski, Angela Kinsey, Mindy Kaling and Brian Baumgartner. Filming began on May 16, 2006.

Release

Critical reception
On Rotten Tomatoes the film has a rating of 7% based on 125 reviews, with an average rating of 3.3/10. The consensus reads, "Featuring one of Robin Williams' most shtick-heavy performances, the broad and formulaic License to Wed wrings little out of its slightly creepy, unappealing premise." On Metacritic it has a score of 25 out of 100, based on 30 reviews, indicating "generally unfavorable reviews". Audiences surveyed by CinemaScore gave the film a grade "B+" on scale of A to F.

It was reviewed in Variety as "an astonishingly flat romantic comedy, filled with perplexing choices."  Numerous reviewers, including Brian Lowry of Variety and MaryAnn Johanson of Flick Filosopher described Williams' character as "creepy" and more worthy of a horror-film villain than a comic lead.

Box office
The film grossed $10,422,258 in its opening weekend opening at #4 at the U.S. Box Office behind Live Free or Die Hard, Ratatouille, and Transformers, which opened at the top spot. As of November 11, 2007, License to Wed had grossed $43.8 million domestically and $70.2 million worldwide, both career highs for Mandy Moore as a lead actress, and a box office success after a $35 million reported budget.

References

External links

 
 
 
 

2007 films
American romantic comedy films
2000s English-language films
2007 romantic comedy films
Films shot in Los Angeles
Films shot in Jamaica
Films shot in Mexico
Films scored by Christophe Beck
Films directed by Ken Kwapis
Village Roadshow Pictures films
Films about weddings
Phoenix Pictures films
Warner Bros. films
2000s American films